Malý Lipník (Malyi Lypnyk) is a village and municipality in Stará Ľubovňa District in the Prešov Region of northern Slovakia.

History

The village of Malý Lipník is mentioned for the first time in a hand-written chronicle in 1715. In other historic periods the village carried these names; in 1715 Kis Lipnik, in 1786 Lipnik, in 1927 Malý Lipník; in Hungarian Kislipnik, Kisharas.  The Greek  Catholic Church of Cosmos and Damien is a made of stone and the church cemetery is located on a hill to the side of the church.

External links
Malý Lipník, Slovakia - The Carpathian Connection

Villages and municipalities in Stará Ľubovňa District
Šariš